Joseph Donald Cooper (born October 30, 1960) is a former American football placekicker who played two seasons in the National Football League with the Houston Oilers and New York Giants. Joe played college football at the University of California, Berkeley and attended Bullard High School in Fresno, California. He was a member of the New York Giants team that won Super Bowl XXI. 

While playing in the NFL, Joe attended law school. His classmates would send him lecture notes and recordings to study. At present, Joe is a practicing attorney and partner at Cooper & Cooper LLP in California's Central Valley Area.

External links
Just Sports Stats
Fanbase profile

Living people
1960 births
Players of American football from California
American football placekickers
California Golden Bears football players
Houston Oilers players
New York Giants players
Sportspeople from Fresno, California